Waffenfabrik Bern  (Weapons Factory Bern), also known as W+F Bern, was an arms manufacturer in Bern, Switzerland, which was a government-owned corporation producing firearms for the Swiss Armed Forces.

List of W+F weapons
Vetterli rifle
Schmidt M1882 - 1882 revolver. Chambered in 7.5 Swiss Ordnance
Schmidt–Rubin - 1889 straight-pull bolt-action rifle. Chambered in 7.5×53.5 Swiss.
Swiss Mannlicher M1893 - straight-pull bolt-action rifle designed by Ferdinand Mannlicher. Chambered in 7.5×53.5 Swiss.
Schmidt–Rubin - 1896 straight-pull bolt-action rifle. Chambered in 7.5×53.5 Swiss.	
Schmidt–Rubin - 1896/11 straight-pull bolt-action rifle. Chambered in 7.5×55 Swiss.		
Schmidt–Rubin - 1911 straight-pull bolt-action rifle. Chambered for the revamped 7.5×53.5 Swiss. The case was lengthened to 55 mm. This new load became the 7.5×55 Swiss. The new load used a modern spitzer bullet and more modern smokeless powders and produces a much higher velocity and pressure than the older 7.5×53.5mm load. 7.5×55mm should never be fired in the 1889 series Schmidt–Rubin.
Parabellum pistol (Pistole 1920, 06/29)
MG 11 - machine gun.	
Flieger-Doppelpistole 1919 - double barrel aircraft submachine gun.
K31 - straight-pull bolt-action rifle. Chambered for 7.5×55mm Swiss.
Bern Pistole 43 - Semi-automatic pistol intended to replace the Luger 06/29 but ended up being discontinued because of the SIG P210
Sturmgewehr 52 & Sturmgewehr 54
MG 51
C42 assault rifle

Notable people
 Adolf Furrer - small arms designer and Colonel in Swiss Army. He was the director of W+F Bern from 1921 and resigned after World War II.

Bibliography
 Fusils & carabines de collection. F. Pellaton, R. Caranta, H. Bonsignori, J. Jordanoglou. Édition Crepin-Leblond 1979
 Die Repetiergewehre der Schweiz (1991)

External links
http://www.swissrifles.com/vetterli/index.html
http://www.schiferli.net/Vetterli.htm
http://www.radix.net/~bbrown/schmidt_rubin.html

Firearm manufacturers of Switzerland
Defunct companies of Switzerland
Companies based in Bern